Constanze Zeitz (born 18 January 1964) is a German luger. She competed in the women's singles event at the 1984 Winter Olympics.

References

1964 births
Living people
German female lugers
Olympic lugers of West Germany
Lugers at the 1984 Winter Olympics